Elections to Metropolitan Borough of Southwark were held in 1931.

The borough had ten wards which returned between 3 and 9 members.

Election result

|}

References

Council elections in the London Borough of Southwark
1931 in London
1931 English local elections